Glyptoscelis pubescens, known generally as the hairy leaf beetle or pine chrysomelid, is a species of leaf beetle. It is found in eastern North America. It is a potential pest of pine trees.

Parasites of G. pubescens include the parasitoid wasps Eupelmus sp. (in Eupelmidae) and Microctonus glyptosceli (in Braconidae, subfamily Euphorinae).

References

Further reading

 

Eumolpinae
Articles created by Qbugbot
Beetles described in 1777
Taxa named by Johan Christian Fabricius
Beetles of North America